Division 1 is the premier professional futsal league in Belgium.  It was founded in 1968.  The league which is played under UEFA rules, currently consists of 14 teams. Organized by Royal Belgian Football Association.

Champions

External links
Futsalplanet 
Futsalbelgium
Futsalteam

Futsal competitions in Belgium
Belgium
Futsal
1968 establishments in Belgium
Sports leagues established in 1968